Edith Noeding (born November 3, 1954 in Lobitos District) is a retired female track and field athlete from Peru, who competed in the hurdles event during her career. She won the gold medal at the 1975 Pan American Games in the women's 100 metres hurdles event. There Noeding set her personal best in the women's 100 metres hurdles event on October 19, 1975, clocking 13.56 in Mexico City. She represented Peru at the 1972 Summer Olympics and 1976 Summer Olympics.

Achievements

References

External links
Athlete profile at Trackfield.brinkster

1954 births
Living people
People from Piura Region
Peruvian people of German descent
Peruvian female hurdlers
Athletes (track and field) at the 1972 Summer Olympics
Athletes (track and field) at the 1976 Summer Olympics
Olympic athletes of Peru
Athletes (track and field) at the 1971 Pan American Games
Athletes (track and field) at the 1975 Pan American Games
Pan American Games gold medalists for Peru
Pan American Games medalists in athletics (track and field)
Medalists at the 1975 Pan American Games